Big & Betsy is a Belgian children's television series produced by Studio 100. The show is centred on the female farmer Betsy, her talking pig Big and their friends.

In 1999, the duo Big and Betsy announced children's television shows for Kanaal 2. This proved very successful and they were given their own television series in November 2000. Approximately 75 episodes have been made. There are a number of Big and Betsy songs, including "The Big Song" which was an animated hit on the Internet.

Characters

References

External links 
 

2000s Belgian television series
2000 Belgian television series debuts
2003 Belgian television series endings
Belgian children's television shows
Fictional farmers
Television series about pigs
Television duos
Children's television characters
Television shows adapted into comics
Belgian television shows featuring puppetry